Enarodustat (development code JTZ-951; brand name Enaroy) is a drug used for the treatment of anemia, especially when associated with chronic kidney disease (CKD).  Enarodustat functions as a inhibitor of hypoxia inducible factor-proly hydroxylase (HIF-PH).

The drug was approved in September 2020 in Japan for anemia associated with CKD and is currently in clinical development in the United States and South Korea.  The drug is being developed by Japan Tobacco and JW Pharmaceutical.

References 

Drugs acting on the blood and blood forming organs
Triazolopyridines
Carboxylic acids
Secondary amino acids
Amides